Diogo Calado (born 17 July 1990) is a Portuguese kickboxer and rapper who began practicing Shito-Ryu Karate at the age of 7. He is now a full-time Muay Thai kickboxer, who has been professionally competing since 2008. 

He is a former Enfusion -75 kg World champion.

In 2020 Diogo signed a contract with the World Lethwei Championship.

He joined Kwalla Music Portugal team in 2019 and released his first songs during the 2020 COVID-19 pandemic, going by the name tKD.

Kickboxing and Muay Thai career
Calado won his first major title, the ISKA European 77kg belt, in 2012, with a first-round TKO of Mike Clarke.

Diogo Calado challenged for the WBC Muaythai World Light Heavyweight title, which was at the time vacant. Calado lost to Cheick Sidibé by second-round TKO due to a cut on his eyebrow.

Calado went on a two-fight losing streak during his next fights. He first lost a decision to Yodsanklai Fairtex, followed by a decision loss to Panom Topkingboxing. He snapped the losing streak with a first-round KO of Lofti Talbi, which earned him the ISKA European 75kg title.

He fought Jiang Chunpeng at Kunlun Fight 22, winning the fight by a third-round KO. After winning a decision against Sameer Siraj, he fought Yohan Lidon, who defeated Calado in a very controversial split decision.

Calado began a five-fight winning streak with a third-round TKO win over Raphaël Llodra to win the Enfusion 75kg Championship. He next won the WBC Muaythai European title with a decision win over Kamel Mezatni. He then fought during Kunlun Fight 41, where he won a decision against Parviz Abdullayev. At Enfusion 40, he won a decision against Jose Bello.

Calado next took part in the Kunlun Fight 47 Tournament. In the quarter finals, Diogo won a decision against Alim Nabiev. In the semi finals, he fought Zhang Yang and lost a decision. Afterwards, he fought the future WBC Muaythai Super Middleweight champion Hamza Ngoto and lost by unanimous decision.

He fought the Albanian kickboxer Shkodran Veseli during the IFN II. Calado won the fight by a unanimous decision.

He made his first title defense against Aziz Kallah. He won the fight by a unanimous decision.

In 2017 Diogo fought Brad Riddell for the inaugural Strikers League 77 kg title. Calado won the fight by a unanimous decision.

Calado made his second Enfusion title defense during Enfusion 54, when he faced Berat Aliu. Calado won the fight by a fourth round head kick KO.

Diogo Calado lost a unanimous decision to Arthit Hanchana during Kunlun Fight 66, in the quarter final round of the Kunlun Fight 75 kg tournament.

He participated in the eight man Enfusion Abu Dhabi tournament. He lost in the first, quarter final round, to the future Enfusion 75 kg champion Endy Semeleer.

Diogo faced Karim Ghajji during Capital Fight 3. The fight went into a fourth round, where Calado won a decision.

Calado fought in the 72.5 kg tournament during Enfusion 72 tournament. He defeated Edye Ruiz in the semi final by decision, and Nayanesh Ayman by decision in the finals.

He participated in the Enfusion Al Shiraa 72.5 kg World Grand Prix. In the quarter finals he faced Zhu Baotong and won a unanimous decision. He then fought Superbon Banchamek in the tournament semi finals and lost a unanimous decision.

Diogo Calado fought Maximo Suarez during Enfusion 81 in Tenerife. He won the fight by a first round knockout.

Calado fought Davide Armanini during the May 2019 Oktagon event. Calado lost the fight by KO.

In December 2021 he participated in IFMA World championships. He fought on the -81 kg weight category where he defeated Cristiano Zachenttin from Brasil on the 16th finals, Ondrej Malina from Czech Republic on the 8th finals, he passed through the quarter-finals due to a no show from the fighter from Denmark and then lost on points on the semi-finals versus Vasyl Sorokin from Ukraine winning a bronze medal.

Due to his bronze medal on the last IFMA World championships, Diogo was invited to fight on The World Games 2022 edition, on the 81kg Muay Thai category. He won a silver medal, losing in the final versus Aaron Ortiz from the USA on a very controversial decision.

Championships and accomplishments
 International Sport Karate Association
 2012 ISKA European Super Middleweight 77 kg Champion
 2014 ISKA European Middleweight 75 kg Champion

 World Boxing Council Muaythai
 2015 WBC Muaythai European Middleweight 72.5 kg Champion

 Enfusion
 2015 Enfusion 75 kg World Champion 
 2017 Enfusion 75 kg Tournament Winner
 2018 Enfusion Al Shiraa 72.5 kg World Grand Prix Runner-up

 Kunlun Fight
 2016 Kunlun Fight 75 kg Tournament Semi-finalist

 Strikers League
 2017 Strikers League 77 kg World Championship
 World Association Kickboxing Organzations
 2007 Junior European championship 75 kg bronze medal
 International Federation of Muay Thai Associations
 2007 Junior World championship 75 kg gold medal
 2008 Junior European championship 75 kg silver medal
 2016 World cup Elite 75 kg silver medal
 2017 World championship Elite 75 kg silver medal
 2021 World championship Elite 81 kg bronze medal
 2022 The World Games 81 kg silver medal

Fight record

|-  bgcolor="#fbb"
| 2019-5-25 || Loss ||align=left| Davide Armanini || Oktagon || Monza, Italy || KO || 1 || 0:27
|-  bgcolor="#cfc"
| 2019-3-30 || Win ||align=left| Maximo Suarez || Enfusion 81 || Tenerife, Spain || KO || 1 ||
|-  bgcolor="#fbb"
| 2018-12-7 || Loss ||align=left| Superbon Banchamek || Enfusion 77, Tournament Finals || Abu Dhabi, United Arab Emirates || Decision (Unanimous) || 3 || 3:00
|-  bgcolor="#cfc"
| 2018-12-7 || Win ||align=left| Zhu Baotong || Enfusion 76, Tournament Semi Finals || Abu Dhabi, United Arab Emirates || Decision (Unanimous) || 3 || 3:00
|-  bgcolor="#cfc"
| 2018-10-6 || Win ||align=left| Nayanesh Ayman || Enfusion 72, Tournament Final || Madrid, Spain || Decision (Unanimous) || 3 || 3:00
|-
! style=background:white colspan=9 |Wins the 72.5kg qualifying tournament to Abu Dhabi.
|-  bgcolor="#cfc"
| 2018-10-6 || Win ||align=left| Edye Ruiz || Enfusion 72, Tournament Semi Final || Madrid, Spain || Decision (Unanimous) || 3 || 3:00
|-  bgcolor="#cfc"
| 2018-5-5 || Win ||align=left| Karim Ghajji || Capital Fights 3 || Paris, France || Decision (Unanimous) || 4 || 3:00
|-  bgcolor="#fbb"
| 2017-12-8 || Loss ||align=left| Endy Semeleer || Enfusion 58 || Abu Dhabi, United Arab Emirates || KO || 3 ||
|-  bgcolor="#fbb"
| 2017-11-5 || Loss ||align=left| Arthit Hanchana || Kunlun Fight 66, Tournament Quarter-Finals || Wuhan, China || Decision (Unanimous) || 3 || 3:00
|-  bgcolor="#cfc"
| 2017-10-7 || Win ||align=left| Berat Aliu || Enfusion 54 || Ludwigsburg, Germany || KO (Head kick) || 4 || 
|-
! style=background:white colspan=9 |
|-  bgcolor="#cfc"
| 2017-05-27 || Win ||align=left| Brad Riddell || Strikers League || Carcavelos, Portugal || Decision (Unanimous) || 3 || 3:00
|-
! style=background:white colspan=9 |
|-  bgcolor="#cfc"
| 2017-03-24 || Win ||align=left| Aziz Kallah || Enfusion 48 || Abu Dhabi, United Arab Emirates || Decision (Unanimous) || 5 || 3:00
|-
! style=background:white colspan=9 |
|-  bgcolor="#cfc"
| 2017-02-25 || Win ||align=left| Shkodran Veseli || Illyrian Fight Night II || Winterthur, Switzerland || Decision (Unanimous) || 5 || 3:00
|-  bgcolor="#fbb"
| 2016-11-19 || Loss ||align=left| Hamza Ngoto || Fight Night Radikal Gold || Charleville-Mézières, France || Decision (Unanimous) || 3 || 3:00
|-  bgcolor="#fbb"
| 2016-7-10 || Loss ||align=left| Zhang Yang || Kunlun Fight 47, Tournament Semi Finals || Nanjing, China || Decision (Unanimous) || 3 || 3:00
|-  bgcolor="#cfc"
| 2016-7-10 || Win ||align=left| Alim Nabiev || Kunlun Fight 47, Tournament Quarter Finals || Nanjing, China || Decision (Unanimous) || 3 || 3:00
|-  bgcolor="#cfc"
| 2016-6-4 || Win ||align=left| Jose Bello || Enfusion 40 || Gran Canaria, Spain || Decision (Unanimous) || 3 || 3:00
|-  bgcolor="#cfc"
| 2016-4-8 || Win ||align=left| Parviz Abdullayev || Kunlun Fight 41 || Nanjing, China || Decision (Unanimous) || 3 || 3:00
|-  bgcolor="#cfc"
| 2015-12-12 || Win ||align=left| Kamel Mezatni || Diamond League || Lisbon, Portugal || Decision (Unanimous) || 5 || 3:00
|-
! style=background:white colspan=9 |
|-  bgcolor="#cfc"
| 2015-12-12 || Win ||align=left| Raphaël Llodra || Enfusion 33 || Martigny, Switzerland || TKO (3 Knockdowns) || 3 || 
|-
! style=background:white colspan=9 |Wins the Enfusion 75kg World title.
|-  bgcolor="#fbb"
| 2015-6-12 || Loss ||align=left| Yohan Lidon || Strike Fight || Lyon, France || Decision (Unanimous) || 3 || 3:00
|-  bgcolor="#cfc"
| 2015-5-9 || Win ||align=left| Sameer Siraj || Muay Thai Arena 6 || Göteborg, Sweden || Decision (Unanimous) || 3 || 3:00
|-  bgcolor="#cfc"
| 2015-4-12 || Win ||align=left| Chunpeng Jiang || Kunlun Fight 22 || Hunan, China || KO || 3 ||
|-  bgcolor="#fbb"
| 2015-2-28 || Loss ||align=left| Saiyok Pumpanmuang || Ring War || Sesto San Giovanni, Italy || TKO (Cut) || 2 || 
|-
! style=background:white colspan=9 |
|-  bgcolor="#cfc"
| 2014-11-15 || Win ||align=left| Lotfi Talbi || Memorial Jorge Martins - La Nuit des Champions || Martigny, Switzerland || KO || 1 || 
|-
! style=background:white colspan=9 |
|-  bgcolor="#fbb"
| 2014-7-6 || Loss ||align=left| Panom Topkingboxing  || Max Muay Thai || Pattaya, Thailand || Decision (Unanimous) || 3 || 3:00
|-  bgcolor="#fbb"
| 2014-4-6 || Loss ||align=left| Yodsanklai Fairtex || Thai Fight || Sattahip, Thailand || Decision (Unanimous) || 3 || 3:00
|-  bgcolor="#cfc"
| 2014-2-22 || Win ||align=left| Ruben Lee || La Noche Del Luchador 2 || Torre de Benagalbón, Spain || Decision (Unanimous) || 3 || 3:00
|-  bgcolor="#fbb"
| 2014-2-1 || Loss ||align=left| Cheick Sidibé || Grande Soirée de la Boxe || Tours, France || TKO (Cut) || 2 || 
|-
! style=background:white colspan=9 |
|-  bgcolor="#cfc"
| 2013-11-16 || Win ||align=left| Mohamed Sariri || Memorial Jorge Martins 9 || Martigny, Switzerland || KO || 4 ||
|-  bgcolor="#cfc"
| 2013-9-28 || Win ||align=left| Jaochalam Chatnakanok || Chitalada Showdown V || Tampere, Finland || KO || 4 ||
|-  bgcolor="#cfc"
| 2013-6-1 || Win ||align=left| Nino Evora || Casino Estoril || Lisbon, Portugal || Decision (Unanimous) || 5 || 3:00
|-  bgcolor="#cfc"
| 2013-4-13 || Win ||align=left| Nino Evora || K-1 World Max Elimination || Loures, Portugal || Decision (Unanimous) || 3 || 3:00
|-  bgcolor="#fbb"
| 2012-11-17 || Loss ||align=left| Carlos La Loba || Muay Thai || Santa Cruz de Tenerife, Spain || TKO || 4 ||
|-  bgcolor="#cfc"
| 2012-10-20 || Win ||align=left| Mike Clarke || Xtreme Combat || Leeds, United Kingdom || TKO || 1 || 
|-
! style=background:white colspan=9 |
|-  bgcolor="#cfc"
| 2011-11-27 || Win ||align=left| Paulo Telmo || WMC Fight Night 2 || São Domingos de Rana, Portugal || Decision (Unanimous) || 3 || 3:00
|-  bgcolor="#cfc"
| 2011-10-8 || Win ||align=left| Pedro Fula || WMC Fight Night || São Domingos de Rana, Portugal || TKO || 3 ||
|-  bgcolor="#cfc"
| 2011-7-23 || Win ||align=left| Francisco Matos || Will 2 Fight || Lisbon, Portugal || KO || 3 ||
|-  bgcolor="#cfc"
| 2011-5-21 || Win ||align=left| Ricardo Madeira || Will 2 Fight || Lisbon, Portugal || KO || 1 ||
|-  bgcolor="#fbb"
| 2010-3-27 || Loss ||align=left| Shemsi Beqiri || WKA World Championship || Geneva, Switzerland || Decision (Unanimous) || 5 || 3:00
|-
! style=background:white colspan=9 |
|-  bgcolor="#fbb"
| 2008-12-6 || Loss ||align=left| Abraham Roqueni || Campeonato Del Mundo De Kick Boxing || Santa Cruz de Tenerife, Spain || Decision (Unanimous) || 5 || 3:00
|-
| colspan=9 | Legend:    

|-  style="background:#fbb;"
| 2022-07-16|| Loss ||align=left| Aaron Ortiz|| World Games 2022, Final ||Bangkok, Thailand || Decision (29:28)|| 3 ||
|-
! style=background:white colspan=9 |
|-  style="background:#cfc;"
| 2022-07-16|| Win ||align=left| Miguel Angel Padilla || World Games 2022, Semi Final ||Bangkok, Thailand || Decision (29:28)|| 3 ||

|-  style="background:#fbb;"
| 2021-12-10|| Loss ||align=left| Vasyl Sorokin || 2021 IFMA World Championships, Semi Final ||Bangkok, Thailand || Decision (30:27)|| 3 ||
|-
! style=background:white colspan=9 |

|-  style="background:#cfc;"
| 2021-12-09|| Win ||align=left| Frederik Emil Beenfeldt Winter || 2021 IFMA World Championships, Quarter Final ||Bangkok, Thailand || Forfeit || 3 ||

|-  style="background:#cfc;"
| 2021-12-08|| Win ||align=left| Ondrej Malina || 2021 IFMA World Championships, Second Round ||Bangkok, Thailand || Decision (30:27)|| 3 ||

|-  style="background:#cfc;"
| 2021-12-06|| Win ||align=left| Cristiano Zanchettin || 2021 IFMA World Championships, First Round ||Bangkok, Thailand || Decision (29:28)|| 3 ||

|-  style="background:#fbb;"
| 2018-07-01|| Loss ||align=left| Martynas Jasiunas || 2018 IFMA European Championships, First Round ||Paris, France || Decision (29:28) || 3 ||

|-  bgcolor="#fbb"
| 2017-07-28 || Loss ||align=left| Vitaly Gurkov || I.F.M.A. World Games 2017, Quarter Finals -75 kg || Poland || Decision || 3 ||
|-

|-  style="background:#fbb;"
| 2017-05-12|| Loss ||align=left| Ivan Grigorev|| 2017 IFMA World Championships, Final ||Minsk, Belarus || TKO|| 3 ||
|-
! style=background:white colspan=9 |

|-  style="background:#cfc;"
| 2017-05-10|| Win ||align=left| Vadim Loparev || 2017 IFMA World Championships, Semi Final || Minsk, Belarus || Decision (29:28)|| 3 ||

|-  style="background:#cfc;"
| 2017-05-08|| Win ||align=left| Vitaly Gurkov || 2017 IFMA World Championships, Quarter Final ||Minsk, Belarus || Decision (29:28)|| 3 ||

|-  style="background:#fbb;"
| 2016-11-26|| Loss ||align=left| Ivan Grigorev|| IFMA World Cup 2016 in Kazan, Final || Kazan, Russia || Decision (split)|| 3 ||
|-
! style=background:white colspan=9 |
|-  style="background:#cfc;"
| 2016-11-24|| Win ||align=left| Mohammad Ghaedibardeh || IFMA World Cup 2016 in Kazan, Semi Final || Kazan, Russia || Decision|| 3 ||
|-
| colspan=9 | Legend:

See also

 List of male kickboxers

References

1990 births
Living people
Sportspeople from Lisbon
Middleweight kickboxers
Portuguese male kickboxers
Kunlun Fight kickboxers
Portuguese Lethwei practitioners
20th-century Portuguese people
21st-century Portuguese people